Ayman al-Fayed (June 19, 1965 – February 15, 2008) was a Palestinian commander of al-Quds Brigades, the armed branch of the Palestinian Islamic Jihad. He operated primarily in the Bureij Palestinian refugee camp.

Death
According to Islamic Jihad, Al-Fayed and eight other Palestinians were killed when an Israeli missile struck his home in the Bureij Palestinian refugee camp near Gaza on February 15, 2008. An Israeli military spokesman said that Israeli forces had no involvement in the incident; later investigations showed the blast was caused by a "work accident" in which the explosives were accidentally detonated at the home used as an arsenal or bomb factory.

References

1965 births
2008 deaths
Palestinian militants
Assassinated Palestinian people